Mark Everett Sloan, M.D., F.A.C.S. is a fictional character from ABC's medical drama television series Grey's Anatomy, portrayed by Eric Dane. Created by showrunner Shonda Rhimes, the character was introduced in season two as Derek Shepherd's best friend. Mark caused the end of Derek’s marriage by sleeping with Derek's then-wife, Addison Montgomery. Mark moves to Seattle in season three to make amends with Derek and becomes Seattle Grace Hospital's new plastic surgery attending, after which he is dubbed "McSteamy" by the female interns for his good looks. Mark's focal storyline in the series involved his romantic relationship with Lexie Grey (Chyler Leigh), one of the interns who was on his service when they started dating. Both he and Lexie sustained fatal injuries during an aviation accident in the eighth-season finale, and Seattle Grace Mercy West is later renamed Grey Sloan Memorial Hospital after their passing.

Storylines

Mark first appears in season two. He is a highly respected plastic surgeon, sub-specialized in otolaryngology and the childhood best friend of neurosurgeon Derek Shepherd (Patrick Dempsey). In his first appearance, he flirts with Meredith Grey, and Derek punches him in the face. Derek explains that Mark had an affair with his wife, Addison (Kate Walsh) while they were living in New York, causing Derek to leave New York. Mark travels to Seattle, intent on convincing Addison to return with him to New York, but his offer is rejected and Derek declines to renew their friendship. Mark returns during season three at Addison's drunken behest, but she again rejects him once sober. Undeterred, Mark sells his successful private practice (which he previously shared with Derek) and takes over the plastics service at Seattle Grace Hospital. During Meredith's morphine rampage, Mark finds out about his nickname McSteamy, which was given to him during his first trip to Seattle when he attempted to get Addison back and re-earn Derek's friendship. It is later revealed that Mark has slept with all of Derek's sisters. Mark has a brief fling with Addison's friend, orthopedic surgeon Callie Torres (Sara Ramirez), and develops a friendship with Derek's girlfriend, intern Meredith Grey (Ellen Pompeo). It is revealed that after Derek left New York, Mark and Addison continued their relationship for two months, during which she conceived and aborted his child. Addison broke their relationship off after she caught him with another woman. Just weeks after moving to Seattle, he quickly observes that Derek's true love is Meredith and tries to convince Addison that her marriage with Derek is over. Mark enters into a sixty-day abstinence pact with Addison, agreeing that if he can remain celibate for that time, Addison will give their relationship another chance. Addison ultimately breaks the pact by having sex with intern Alex Karev (Justin Chambers), and soon thereafter departs from Seattle to work in Los Angeles.

Mark supports Derek when Meredith comes close to dying after drowning, and the two are able to rekindle their friendship. It is eventually revealed that he and Derek grew up together and that he, having lost his mother as a child and his father emotionally neglecting him, considered Derek's mother as his maternal figure. As he was an only child and Derek was the only son, they became close friends and he was Derek's best man at the latter's wedding to Addison. He also forms a friendship with Callie, and develops an attraction to cardiothoracic surgeon Erica Hahn (Brooke Smith). Erica does not reciprocate his feelings, and he is supportive of Callie when she and Erica have a brief relationship. When Addison shows up at Seattle Grace for a case, Mark attempts to sleep with Addison again but she refuses. The nurses later start a club against him called Nurses United Against Mark Sloan. After a string of unresolved sexual tension on his part, Mark then finds himself seduced by Lexie Grey (Chyler Leigh), despite Derek's request that he keep their relationship platonic even before their relationship had begun. They begin a sexual relationship, which Lexie halts until he is willing to publicly admit to being her partner. Mark eventually agrees and tells Derek, who attacks him. Animosity exists between them for several episodes, before they once more repair their friendship. Mark and Lexie's relationship becomes increasingly serious. He meets her father, Thatcher (Jeff Perry), and at the end of season five, asks Lexie to move in with him. Though Lexie initially declines, he remains committed to their relationship, and she agrees early in season six.

Mark discovers that he has an 18-year-old daughter, Sloan Riley (Leven Rambin), who arrives seeking his support after becoming pregnant and being evicted by her mother. Mark allows her to move in with him, which upsets Lexie. When Lexie makes it clear that she knew that Mark would choose his own daughter over her, she puts an end to their relationship. Sloan experiences difficulties in her pregnancy, so Mark takes her to LA to be treated. He and Addison once again sleep together, but when he comes back he tells Lexie because he doesn't want to lie to her and wants them to get back together, but when she tells him she slept with Alex it puts an end to their relationship. When Sloan decides to give her baby up for adoption, Mark and Callie offer to raise it together. Sloan unwillingly agrees, but then quietly leaves Seattle, leaving Mark distraught. He enters into a relationship with cardiothoracic surgeon Teddy Altman (Kim Raver), despite the fact she is in love with their trauma colleague, Owen Hunt (Kevin McKidd). Sloan returns unexpectedly and gives birth to a son in Mark’s apartment. She reconsiders the adoption, but when Mark reassures her that he will support her no matter what, she gives the baby to an adoptive couple from Washington.

In the sixth-season finale, a gunman commits mass murder at the hospital. Mark helps Lexie save Alex, her new boyfriend. In the aftermath of the shooting, Lexie has a nervous breakdown and Mark has her committed to the psychiatric unit. Their friendship is strained, however Lexie softens towards him when she learns that he is still in love with her. As Lexie goes to talk to Mark about him still being in love with her, she sees Mark entering his apartment with Derek's sister Amelia, kissing her and ultimately sleeping with her. When Callie's girlfriend, pediatric surgeon Arizona Robbins (Jessica Capshaw), breaks up with her, she and Mark have a drunken one-night stand. Shortly thereafter, he reconciles with Lexie, but is delighted when Callie discovers she is pregnant with his child. Lexie, however, is dismayed and angered by the news and leaves Mark once again. Mark takes quickly to fatherhood when his daughter, Sofia, is born.

Mark asks Dr. Jackson Avery to find out how Lexie's doing, but Jackson lies to Mark that he wasn't able to find anything out, and he (Jackson) starts dating Lexie shortly after that. In the meanwhile, Callie and Mark's daughter is born. Mark later gives Jackson and Lexie his blessing, and tells Lexie he will let her go; Lexie replies that she is still in love with him, but right now she needs Jackson to be happy. After giving Jackson a hard time, Mark finally acknowledges his surgery skills and decides to teach him, although he still evidences feelings towards Lexie. After a long time without dating, Mark finally embarks on a relationship with Julia. This makes Lexie jealous, which leads to her and Jackson breaking up. Lexie struggles to tell Mark how she feels but finally admits it, leaving him torn between her and Julia. In the season 8 finale, Mark, Lexie, Derek, Meredith, Cristina, and Arizona are involved in an aviation accident while on the way to Boise, Idaho to perform surgery on conjoined twins, crushing Lexie under debris. After trying and failing to save her, Mark holds dying Lexie by the hand, telling her that he has always and will always love her. He and the remaining surviving crash victims are left stranded in the woods, mourning Lexie and fighting to stay alive.

In the ninth-season premiere, it is discovered that Mark is on life support due to the extensive injuries he sustained in the plane crash and, as determined by his will, the machines would be turned off if he showed no signs of waking within 30 days. Flashbacks of some moments in Mark's life showcased him being videotaped as he was extending his congratulations to newlyweds Callie and Arizona. At the end of the speech, he declares that Lexie was the one he wanted to grow old and dance with at their granddaughter's wedding. At 5:00 that day, with Derek and Callie keeping vigil at his bedside, the machines were turned off. Mark died shortly thereafter. The following episode reveals that he had a surge of good health upon his return to Seattle Grace before ultimately succumbing to his injuries. His 'surge' allowed him enough energy to advise his protégé Jackson, 'when you love someone, tell them', which is believed to be a reflection on the major obstacle of his failed relationship with Lexie. During this momentary energy, Mark also took the opportunity to make a clean break with his girlfriend, Julia, stating that the situation was not fair to her as he had always loved only Lexie. Following his death, Shonda Rhimes muses regarding Mark and Lexie's relationship: '...he and Lexie get to be together in a way. Their love remains true." Seattle Grace Mercy West Hospital is later renamed Grey Sloan Memorial Hospital in tribute to Lexie and Mark.

Development

Casting and creation

Dane auditioned for the role during the casting of the pilot and ultimately received the role, which was only later introduced in the show. He initially appeared as a guest-star in the episode "Yesterday" of the second season, becoming a series regular from the third season episode "Sometimes a Fantasy", first broadcast in October 2006. Casting director Linda Lowy gave the insight: "You can't forget about McSteamy. We cast (Dane) for one episode, and I think the women across the nation went kind of crazy. Everyone was talking about him, so we decided to make him a regular." In July 2012, TVLine announced Dane would leave the show after the first two episodes of the ninth season. Rhimes said she and Dane decided to end Mark's storyline after much discussion. She added: "It was a thing that Eric had been thinking about for a while, but it felt like the right time to him." However, E! Online reported that Rhimes had been forced by the network to reduce the cast for budget reasons and that Dane had not asked to leave the series.

Characterization

The American Broadcasting Company (ABC) characterized Sloan as "charming", "confident", "smug", "smarmy", and "great with his hands". Shonda Rhimes said of the character: "Mark, the original bad boy, is struggling with his own demons. He brings a healthy serving of mystery and potential conflict to Seattle Grace." Actress Kate Walsh said: "He's the guy you shouldn't go out with but you can't help yourself." Carolina Paiz, one of the writers of the series, wrote: "he can be impertinent and evil and demeaning."

Reception

Mark Sloan's relationship with Chyler Leigh's Lexie Grey has been well received by critics and fans alike, with Chris Monfette of IGN writing: "Sloan's honest relationship with Lexie helped to make both characters infinitely more interesting and mature."

His role in the episode "In the Midnight Hour" from the fifth season was well received by Debbie Chang of BuddyTV who wrote, "Mark (Eric Dane) is pretty freaking awesome in this episode. He's lascivious as all heck, but he's showing some compassion." His scenes with Shepherd were described as "fun." Victor Balta of Today listed their friendship in its "TV's best bromances". He called them "the most exciting couple on Grey’s", explaining "they’ve demonstrated an easy chemistry that makes for some of the great comic relief around Seattle Grace Hospital with their banter, sage wisdom on each other’s lives, and locker room-style teasing". Their bromance was furthermore included in lists by About.com, BuddyTV, Cosmopolitan, Wetpaint. However, following the announcement of Dane's upcoming departure from the show, Mark Perigard of the Boston Herald felt he and Derek "never clicked like you’d expect friends would. Any scene they had together ranged from uncomfortable to forced."

His bromance with Jackson Avery was also well received. Janalen Samson of BuddyTV wrote: "Eric Dane has always shown a facility for sly, deft comedy and these scenes with Jesse Williams are proving to be gems. I do love a good Bromance and these two actors are bringing the love and the funny in spades." Writing for TV Fanatic, Courtney Morrison commented: "Sloan has brought the GA comedy scale up a bit with his bromances and mentoring Jackson." The pairing was listed in Zap2it's 25 Top Bromances of 2012. Los Angeles Times TV columnist, Carina Mackenzie, described his scenes with Torres as "always perfectly sharp".

At the 13th Screen Actors Guild Awards, Dane was part of the Grey's Anatomy cast awarded the "Outstanding Performance by an Ensemble in a Drama Series" accolade, for which they were also nominated the following year.

References

Sources

External links
Mark Sloan at ABC.com

Grey's Anatomy characters
Fictional characters from New York City
Fictional Columbia University people
Television characters introduced in 2006
Fictional plastic surgeons
American male characters in television